Strongylocentrotus is a genus of sea urchins in the family Strongylocentrotidae containing several species.

Species
The World Register of Marine Species includes:

References

External links
 The sea urchin Strongylocentrotus purpuratus genomic data base from California Institute of Technology

 
Strongylocentrotidae